Zincolivenite is a copper zinc arsenate mineral with formula CuZn(AsO4)(OH) that is a member of the olivenite group. Its colors range from green to blue, and its name comes from its composition of zinc and olivenite.

It was first described from St Constantine, Lavrion District Mines, Laurium, Attica, Greece. It was approved by the International Mineralogical Association in 2006.

References

Orthorhombic minerals
Minerals in space group 58
Zinc minerals
Arsenate minerals